HMS Dunkirk's Prize was a 26-gun French privateer, Le Hocquart of St Malo taken by HMS Dunkirk in September 1705. She was purchased and registered on 15 November 1705. She was commissioned into the Royal Navy in 1706 for service in the West Indies. She was grounded and lost while chasing a French privateer which also went aground and was captured. She was lost in 1708.

Dunkirk's Prize was the third named ship since it was used for a 2-gun ketch captured from the French in 1656 and sold in 1660.

Specifications
She was captured in September 1705 and purchased on 15 November 1705. Her tonnage calculation was  tons. Her armament was twenty-six 6-pounders on the upper deck with and six 3-pounders on the quarterdeck all on wooden trucks.

Commissioned Service
She was commissioned in 1706 under the command of Commander Edward Holland, RN for service in the West Indies. In 1708 Commander George Purvis, RN took command.

Disposition
She ran aground while pursuing a French privateer off Cap Francois, Haiti. The privateer also ran aground and was captured by the British. Dunkirk's Prize was lost on 18 October 1708.

Citations

References
 Winfield, British Warships in the Age of Sail (1603 – 1714), by Rif Winfield, published by Seaforth Publishing, England © 2009, EPUB , Chapter 6, The Sixth Rates, Vessels acquired from 18 December 1688, Sixth Rates of 20 guns and up to 26 guns, Ex-French Prizes (1704–09), Dunkirk's Prize
 Colledge, Ships of the Royal Navy, by J.J. Colledge, revised and updated by Lt Cdr Ben Warlow and Steve Bush, published by Seaforth Publishing, Barnsley, Great Britain, © 2020, e  (EPUB), Section S (Dunkirk's Prize)

 

1700s ships
Corvettes of the Royal Navy
Naval ships of the United Kingdom